Runshaw College is a Higher and Further Education college based in Leyland, England.

History
Runshaw College was established in 1974. It initially catered solely for school leavers from Balshaw's High School in Leyland, and Parklands High School in Chorley. In 1983 it became a tertiary college following a reorganisation by Lancashire's education authority.

Locations
Runshaw's current campus in Leyland, is a sixth form college primarily catering for students aged 16–19, as well as hosting adult education and apprenticeship courses. The Euxton Lane, Chorley, campus was the centre for adult and higher education.

Leyland Campus 
The Leyland Campus has 13 buildings plus a student services centre, three sports courts and a public restaurant alongside the numerous student restaurants.

Runshaw's buildings are named after areas of the Lake District. There are currently 11 educational buildings and two student services and study buildings. Dalehead is also the home to the Foxholes restaurant, which closed in 2018 due to budget cuts.

Chorley Campus 

Runshaw operated a campus in Chorley until the end of 2022. This campus used to be where many of the Apprenticeship and Adult Education courses were held. The site also hosted the Runshaw Business Centre, meeting the needs of local small and medium-sized enterprises; and Runshaw Training, offering apprenticeships and vocational training.

On December 5th 2022, Runshaw announced they would sell the campus to Lancashire Constabulary and move the courses that were held there to the main Leyland campus. Lancashire Constabulary plan to turn the old campus into a new training centre and operations centre where Chorley's response team, and other specialist teams will be relocated to from the old town centre police station.

Facilities 
The college has a number of specialist labs and facilities including a cabin crew set, media and makeup rooms, photography studios, stage and green rooms, and sports facilities housing a gym and three sports courts.

In addition to education facilities Runshaw also has a number of rooms that students can use in their free time, such as Runshaw Radio, which broadcasts across campus and is frequently operated by students.

Runshaw also announced that they are beginning to Esports as a course in May 2022, and opened a new Esports centre in 2022 which is fitted with 15 Alienware PCs.

In 2023 Runshaw opened it's new educational building Buttermere which is home to the college's new Professional Engineering School which will include courses in T-Level in Digital and Civil Engineering as well as a new Architecture Academy opening in March 2023.

Notable students

David Unsworth, footballer
Graeme Ballard, Paralympian athlete
Holly Bradshaw, pole vaulter
Derek Draper, New Labour spin doctor
John Thomson, actor and comedian
Joe Gilgun, actor
Kevin Simm and Jessica Taylor, singers with Liberty X
Lloyd Cole, songwriter was lead singer of Lloyd Cole and the Commotions
Melissa-Jane Daniel, archery world record-holder
Michael Jennings, former British champion welterweight boxer
Tim Farron, MP for Westmorland and Lonsdale and former leader of the Liberal Democrats
Rachel McCarthy, scientist, poet and broadcaster
Tom Cahill, footballer 
Tom Smith, England national cricketer
Samantha Robinson, actress
Amanda Roocroft, opera singer
Dave Ryding, alpine ski racer
Steve Pemberton, actor, writer and comedian
Liv Cooke, professional football freestyler
Monty Lord, British author

References

External links 
 Runshaw College official website

Education in the Borough of Chorley
Education in South Ribble
Buildings and structures in the Borough of Chorley
Buildings and structures in South Ribble
Further education colleges in Lancashire
Learning and Skills Beacons
Educational institutions established in 1974
1974 establishments in England
Leyland, Lancashire